Partridge wood may refer to:

 Andira inermis (Fabaceae), a Neotropical tree species

See also
 Millettia laurentii (Fabaceae)
 Gonialoe variegata